Loudenslager is a surname of German origin. Notable people with the surname include:

Charlie Loudenslager (1881–1933), American baseball player
Henry C. Loudenslager (1852–1911), American politician
Leo Loudenslager (1944–1997), American aviator

References

Surnames of German origin